†Perdicella zebrina was a species of tropical, tree-living, air-breathing, land snail, an arboreal pulmonate gastropod mollusk in the family Achatinellidae.  This species was endemic to Hawaii in the United States.

References

Z
Molluscs of Hawaii
Extinct gastropods
Extinct Hawaiian animals
Taxonomy articles created by Polbot